Pocatello National Forest was established as the Pocatello Forest Reserve by the General Land Office in Idaho and Utah on September 5, 1903, with .  After the transfer of federal forests to the U.S. Forest Service in 1905, it became a National Forest on March 4, 1907. On July 1, 1908, Port Neuf National Forest and part of Bear River National Forest were added.  On July 1, 1915, the entire forest was transferred to Cache National Forest and the name was discontinued. The lands are presently included in Caribou National Forest and Uinta-Wasatch-Cache National Forest.

References

External links
Forest History Society
Listing of the National Forests of the United States and Their Dates (from the Forest History Society website) Text from Davis, Richard C., ed. Encyclopedia of American Forest and Conservation History. New York: Macmillan Publishing Company for the Forest History Society, 1983. Vol. II, pp. 743–788.

Former National Forests of Idaho
Former National Forests of Utah